"Happy Christmas" is a spoken or written greeting commonly used on or before the Christmas holiday.

Happy Christmas may also refer to:

Music
 Happy Christmas (compilation album), a 1998 compilation album released by BEC Records
 Happy Christmas Vol. 2, released in 1999
 Happy Christmas Vol. 3, released in 2000
 Happy Christmas Vol. 4, released in 2005
 Happy Christmas Vol. 5, released in 2010
 Happy Christmas (Jessica Simpson album), 2010
 Happy Christmas (EP), a 2010 EP by I Can Make a Mess Like Nobody's Business
 "Happy Christmas" (Bae Seul Ki single), 2006
 "Happy Xmas (War Is Over)", a 1971 single by John Lennon, Yoko Ono, and the Plastic Ono Band
 The 20 Greatest Christmas Songs, 1986 album by Boney M. that was re-issued in 1991 as Happy Christmas

Other uses
 Happy Christmas (film), a 2014 film

See also
 Happy Ero Christmas, a 2003 South Korean romantic comedy film
 Merry Christmas (disambiguation)